Star City is a small town of 460 inhabitants in Saskatchewan, Canada, approximately  southeast of Prince Albert and 18 km (10 mi) east of Melfort.

It is named after its first postmaster, Walter Starkey. The town's economy is based primarily on agriculture. It has numerous services and a small K-12 school.

Demographics 

Historic buildings

The town has two historic buildings:
 The Town Office Building was constructed between 1919 and 1920 for the Bank of Commerce; the building currently houses a library.
 Golden Age Club Buildings

References

Towns in Saskatchewan